Peninsula High School is a public alternative high school in San Bruno, California, United States It uses Crestmoor High School's building. It is part of the San Mateo Union High School District (SMUHSD). Its main purpose is to aid students who are behind in credits that are necessary for graduation.

Curriculum
All graduate must complete at least 220 credits of work in English (40), mathematics (30), social science (35), physical education (20), science (20), fine and performing arts (10), health (5), and electives (60).

Peninsula earned a six-year educational accreditation in 2001 from the Western Association of Schools and Colleges.

The school has partnered with a local business, Culinary Twist, to construct packaging for its products.

Demographics
2011-2012
 261 students: 161 male (61.7%), 100 female (38.3%)

As of 2015, the majority of the students attending Peninsula used to attend San Mateo High School.

Standardized testing

On-campus resources
The Child Development Center is Peninsula's on-campus day care center. This allows teen parents who are SMUHSD residents to receive an education and earn a high school diploma.

See also

San Mateo County high schools

References

External links
Peninsula High School - official website

Educational institutions in the United States with year of establishment missing
High schools in San Mateo County, California
Public high schools in California